Hovala amena is a butterfly in the family Hesperiidae. It is found in north-western Madagascar.

References

Butterflies described in 1891
Heteropterinae
Butterflies of Africa